Cook County Board of Commissioners 2nd district is an electoral district for the Cook County Board of Commissioners.

The district was established in 1994, when the board transitioned from holding elections in individual districts, as opposed to the previous practice of holding a set of two at-large elections (one for ten seats from the city of Chicago and another for seven seats from suburban Cook County).

Geography

1994 boundaries
When the district was first established, it represented central Chicago.

2001 redistricting
New boundaries were adopted in August 2001, with redistricting taking place following the 2000 United States Census.

The district continued to entirely lay within the city of Chicago. It represented parts of the central city, West Side, and South Side of the city.

2012 redistricting
The district currently, as redistricted in 2012 following the 2010 United States Census, continues to lay entirely within the city of Chicago. It represents parts of the central city, West Side, and South Side of the city.

The district is 24.91 square miles (15,942.15 acres).

Politics
All commissioners representing this district, since its inception, have been Democrats.

List of commissioners representing the district

Election results

|-
| colspan=16 style="text-align:center;" |Cook County Board of Commissioners 2nd district general elections
|-
!Year
!Winning candidate
!Party
!Vote (pct)
!Opponent
!Party
! Vote (pct)
|-
|1994
| |Bobbie L. Steele
| |Democratic
| | 41,541
|Text style="background:#D2B48C | David Whitehead
|Text style="background:#D2B48C |Harold Washington Party
|Text style="background:#D2B48C | 
|-
|1998
| |Bobbie L. Steele
| | Democratic
| |61,487 (100%)
|
|
|
|-
|2002
| |Bobbie L. Steele
| | Democratic
| |59,011 (100%)
|
|
|
|-
|2006
| |Robert B. Steele
| | Democratic
| |59,668 (88.18%)
| | Michael Smith
| | Green
| | 7,996 (11.82%)
|-
|2010
| |Robert B. Steele
| | Democratic
| |61,499 (87.53%)
| | Michael Smith
| | Green
| | 8,761 (12.47%)
|-
|2014
| |Robert B. Steele
| | Democratic
| |57,091 (100%)
| 
| 
| 
|-
|2018
| |Dennis Deer
| | Democratic
| |78,380 (100%)
| 
| 
| 
|-
|2022
| |Dennis Deer
| | Democratic
| |53,053 (87.92%)
| | Evan Kasal
| | Republican
| | 7,292 (12.08%)

References

Cook County Board of Commissioners districts
Constituencies established in 1994
1994 establishments in Illinois